Tah Mac (born  in Brooklyn, New York as D. Tah Macintosh or Tayshaun Macintosh), is an American rapper and songwriter, who rose to fame as a producer of various Hip hop and R&B acts, before releasing his first solo album in 2009.

Mac released his album "Welcome 2 Tahland" in March 2009, featuring the collaboration "Give Back" with Mutya Buena.

References

External links
Tah Mac's Official Website

African-American rappers
Living people
Rappers from New York City
1980 births
20th-century African-American people